Jefferson Township is one of twelve townships in Boone County, Indiana. As of the 2010 census, its population was 1,464 and it contained 544 housing units.

Geography

Unincorporated towns
 Dover
 Hazelrigg
 Max
 Shannondale
(This list is based on USGS data and may include former settlements.)

Adjacent townships
 Center (east)
 Jackson (south)
 Sugar Creek (north)
 Washington (northeast)
 Franklin Township, Montgomery County (west)
 Walnut Township, Montgomery County (southwest)

Major highways
  Indiana State Road 32
  Indiana State Road 75

Cemeteries
The township contains six cemeteries. They include: Cox Cemetery, Dover Cemetery, Old Mount Zion, Hiestand Cemetery, Taylor Cemetey, and Pleasant View Church Cemetery.

References
 
 United States Census Bureau cartographic boundary files

External links
 Indiana Township Association
 United Township Association of Indiana

Townships in Boone County, Indiana
Townships in Indiana